Ingegerd Haraldsdotter (c. 1046 – c. 1120) was a Norwegian princess who, by her successive marriages, became queen of Denmark and Sweden. Her husbands were Olaf I of Denmark (died 1095) and Philip of Sweden (died 1118).

Biography 
Ingegerd Haraldsdotter was the daughter of King Harald Hardrada of Norway and Elisiv of Kiev and thereby the great-granddaughter of King Olof Skötkonung of Sweden and the granddaughter of Yaroslav the Wise, Grand Prince of Kiev. She was first married to Olaf I of Denmark, in approximately 1067, in a marriage arranged as a part of the peace treaty between Denmark and Norway; to further strengthen the alliance, Olof's half-sister, Ingerid, married King Olav Kyrre, who was the brother of Queen Ingegerd. Ingegerd became queen of Denmark when Olof became king in 1086.

After his death in 1095, the queen dowager traveled to Sweden, where she married King Inge the Elder's nephew Philip in 1095 or 1096. He became king in 1105, making her queen a second time. There is no known issue from the second marriage. She was widowed in 1118. The years of her birth and death are not confirmed, but she is known to have survived her second spouse.

References

Notes 

Norwegian princesses
Danish royal consorts
Ingigarth 1105
1040s births
1120 deaths
12th-century Swedish people
12th-century Danish people
12th-century Norwegian people
12th-century Swedish women
12th-century Danish women
12th-century Norwegian women
House of Hardrada
House of Estridsen
House of Stenkil
Remarried royal consorts
Daughters of kings